Svalutation is the 16th album by Italian singer Adriano Celentano, issued in 1976. The word "svalutation" is a mock English word coined after the Italian "svalutazione", which correctly translates to "devaluation", and the title track ironizes on the Italian economical and political crisis of the time.

The album named a television musical variety show, written and presented by the same Celentano and broadcast on Rai 3 in 1992.

Track listing
 "I Want to Know" (Santercole-Celentano-Beretta) 2'48
 "Svalutation" (Santercole-Celentano-Pallavicini-Beretta) 3'00
 "La camera 21" (Santercole-Pallavicini-Beretta) 5'23
 "La neve" (Santercole-Celentano-Beretta) 7'00
 "Uomo macchina" (Santercole) 3'42
 "La Barca" (Santercole-Celentano-Pallavicini-Beretta) 4'41
 "Ricordo" (Adricel) 4'05
 "I Want to Know" (Santercole-Celentano-Beretta) 4'05

Footnotes

1976 albums
Adriano Celentano albums